Henry Hutchins (1819–1889) was an American merchant shipwright during a prolific period at Yarmouth Harbor in Maine. His shipyard was one of the four major ones during the town's peak years, between 1850 and 1875.

Career

In 1851, Hutchins went into partnership with Edward J. Stubbs, forming Hutchins & Stubbs. They launched over 21 vessels at Yarmouth's harbor between 1866 and 1884, including the three-mast barkentine Harriet S. Jackson.

Personal life
Hutchins was married to Harriet, with whom he lived at number 85 Pleasant Street (built in 1848) in Yarmouth. She died on Christmas Eve, 1869, aged 43. He remarried, to Tryphena (1830–1904).

Death
Hutchins died in 1889, aged 69 or 70. His wife, Tryphena, survived him by fifteen years. He is buried, with both of his wives, at Yarmouth's Riverside Cemetery. They share a burial plot with the families of Captain Edwin W. Hill and Hermon Seabury.

References

People from Yarmouth, Maine
1819 births
1889 deaths
American shipwrights
Burials in Maine